Merl Harry Reagle (January 5, 1950 – August 22, 2015) was an American crossword constructor. For 30 years, he constructed a puzzle every Sunday for the San Francisco Chronicle (originally the San Francisco Examiner), which he syndicated to more than 50 Sunday newspapers, including the Washington Post, the Los Angeles Times, the Philadelphia Inquirer, the Seattle Times, The Plain Dealer (Cleveland, Ohio), the Hartford Courant, the New York Observer, and the Arizona Daily Star. Reagle also produced a bimonthly crossword puzzle for AARP The Magazine magazine, a monthly crossword puzzle for the Society of Former Special Agents of the FBI,  and puzzles for the American Crossword Puzzle Tournament.

Biography
Reagle was born in Audubon, New Jersey on January 5, 1950. He made his first crossword when he was six years old and sold a puzzle to The New York Times at age 16, a feat that made him the youngest published Times puzzle constructor at the time.  He attended the University of Arizona, but dropped out a few credits short of a degree in English.

Reagle first competed in the American Crossword Puzzle Tournament in 1979, its second year, and placed third. He submitted a puzzle to the contest starting in 1980 and, later served as a tournament judge and a commentator for the tournament's finals.

In the early 1980s Reagle began submitting crossword puzzles to Dell crossword magazine, Games magazine, and Margaret Farrar's Simon & Schuster books. He regarded crossword-making as more of a hobby, working as a television scriptwriter by day and a film scriptwriter by night. In 1985 he was contracted to produce a regular Sunday crossword for the San Francisco Examiners new Sunday magazine. Three years later, he went into syndication.

In the 1990s Reagle was regarded as one of the top producers of a new type of crossword puzzle: "less stodgy and more hip." This trend was encouraged by The New York Times crossword puzzle editor Will Shortz, who sought to appeal to a wider and younger readership with "pop culture references ... humorous word play, and ... unique and clever themes".

In 2011 Reagle donated his expertise to produce an awareness-building campaign for the Alzheimer's Foundation of America. Reagle created the National Brain Game Challenge, an online contest featuring a Sunday crossword that contains a clued secret message. Cash prizes, including a first prize of $25,000, are awarded in two categories, "casual solver" and "puzzle professional".

Reagle was one of the few crossword constructors who made a living solely through puzzlemaking, as he retained all rights to his puzzles. They are reprinted in books that he sold under his own imprint, PuzzleWorks. With the assistance of his wife, Marie Haley, he published more than 20 volumes of his Sunday crosswords, which he sold from his website. Merl and Marie made their home in the Tampa Bay, Florida area.

Reagle died August 22, 2015, after being hospitalized two days earlier for acute pancreatitis.

Representative puzzles: humor and wide-open grids
The New York Times crossword puzzle editor Will Shortz has said that "his [Reagle's] themes are consistently fresher and funnier than anyone else's. And he's one of the greatest puzzlemakers at interlocking words in intricate, wide-open patterns". Games magazine has called Reagle "the best Sunday crossword creator in America". A poll of puzzlemakers at cruciverb.com, a popular website for crossword constructors, ranked Reagle the most admired by his peers. His 2004 puzzle, "Wide Open Spaces", holds the record for the lowest word count (i.e., number of answers) in a Sunday puzzle. The 21 x 21 grid has only 112 words (with 51 black squares).  The prolific crossword editor Stanley Newman called Reagle's puzzle "Gridlock" "the best single crossword of the last 25 years." "Gridlock" featured a "thick traffic jam of car names crossing in the center".

His fellow constructors routinely credit Reagle for creating some of the funniest themes for his puzzles. One, called "Hit Song", was what he called "Sean Penn's version of "My Way".  It included the theme entries I'M IN A / RUSH, NO PICTURES, PLEASE, OR / ELSE YOU'LL LEARN THE / BLACKENED EYE WAY / THE RECORD SHOWS / I'LL BUST YOUR / NOSE IF YOU GET IN... / MY WAY. Other much-discussed puzzles carried titles like "Inappropriate Muzak for a Doctor's Office" and "Least Popular Beanie Babies".

Portrayal in Wordplay
He was noted for making puzzles with pencil and paper, instead of with the aid of a computer. The 2006 documentary Wordplay depicted Reagle's on-camera construction of a crossword that subsequently was published in The New York Times.  The film then showed various famous crossword enthusiasts, including Bill Clinton, Jon Stewart, the Indigo Girls, and Mike Mussina, attempting to solve the puzzle.

Other appearances
In the late 1960s and early 1970s Reagle was a member of a psychedelic rock band Greylock Mansion. He played the organ and performed the lead vocals and was also the main songwriter for the group. The band released two singles in their active period but never got a deal for a full album. All of their old recordings were finally released in 2016 by an underground label Lysergic Sound Distributors. Unfortunately Merl Reagle died during the production of the album and never got to witness its release.

On November 16, 2008, Reagle was a "special guest voice" on an episode of The Simpsons called "Homer and Lisa Exchange Cross Words." In the episode, which featured a New York Times crossword, a cartoon version of Reagle appeared together with Shortz, and Lisa Simpson discovered secret messages embedded in both the clues and the puzzle, which Reagle constructed and Shortz edited. The actual crossword appearing that same day in the Times had the embedded messages.

Reagle also was featured on CNN, the Today show, Nightline, Oprah, and National Public Radio. In 2013, the Washington Post featured an online interview in its "The Fold" feature.

References

External links

 Reagle's Sunday Crosswords website

1950 births
People from Audubon, New Jersey
Crossword compilers
2015 deaths
Deaths from pancreatitis